Novyye Kamyshly (Yañı Qamışlı) is a rural locality (a village) in Starokamyshlinsky Selsoviet, Kushnarenkovsky District, Bashkortostan, Russia. The population was 53 as of 2010. There is 1 street.

Geography 
Novyye Kamyshly is located 48 km southeast of Kushnarenkovo (the district's administrative centre) by road. Beryozovka is the nearest rural locality.

References 

Rural localities in Kushnarenkovsky District